The 2014 Northeast Conference men's basketball tournament was held on March 5, 8, and 11. The tournament featured the league's top eight seeds. The tourney opened on Wednesday, March 5 with the quarterfinals, followed by the semifinals on Saturday, March 8 and the finals on Tuesday, March 11. Mount St. Mary's won the championship, its fourth, and received the conferences automatic bid to the 2014 NCAA tournament.

Format
For the tenth straight year, the NEC Men’s Basketball Tournament will consist of an eight-team playoff format with all games played at the home of the higher seed. After the quarterfinals, the teams will be reseeded so the highest remaining seed plays the lowest remaining seed in the semifinals.

Seeds
Teams are seeded based on the final regular season standings, with ties broken under an NEC policy.

Bracket

All games were played at the venue of the higher seed

Game Summaries

Quarterfinals: Robert Morris vs. Fairleigh Dickinson
Series History: RMU leads 39-30

Quarterfinals: Mount St. Mary's vs. St. Francis Brooklyn 
Series History: MSM leads 31-29
Announcers: Dave Popkin, Terry O'Connor, Paul Dottino

Quarterfinals: Wagner vs. Central Connecticut
Series History: WC leads 20-19

Quarterfinals: Saint Francis (PA) at Bryant 
Series History: BU leads 6-3

Semifinal: Mount St. Mary's at Wagner
Series History: WC leads 32-19
Announcers: Paul Dottino, Tim Capstraw, Matt Martucci

Semifinal: Robert Morris vs. Saint Francis (PA)
Series History: RMU leads 48-28
Announcers: John Schmeelk, Joe DeSantis, Pat O'Keefe

Championship: Mount St. Mary's at Robert Morris
Series History: RMU leads 30-27
Announcers: Mike Crispino, Miles Simon

All-tournament team
Tournament MVP in bold.

References

Northeast Conference men's basketball tournament
Tournament
Northeast Conference men's basketball tournament
Northeast Conference men's basketball tournament